Cathariostachys is a genus of Madagascan bamboo in the grass family.

Species
 Cathariostachys capitata   - eastern Madagascar
 Cathariostachys madagascariensis (A.Camus) S.Dransf. - central Madagascar

References

External links

 
Bambusoideae genera
Endemic flora of Madagascar